Lojacono is a family name of Italian origin. It may refer to:

 Alvaro Lojacono,  Italian terrorist
 Corrado Lojacono, Italian singer
 Francesco Lojacono, Italian painter
 Francisco Lojacono, Italian Argentine footballer
  Matilde Lojacono, birth name of  Italian actress Matilde Gioli

See also 
 Jacono

References

Italian-language surnames